Gudhjem is a small town and fishing port on the northern coast of the Baltic island of Bornholm, Denmark. Its population is 736 (1 January 2022).

Gudhjem is a popular venue for tourists who are attracted by its steep, picturesque streets, views and atmosphere.

History

Its history as a fishing village goes back many years. The former church, St Anne's Chapel, now a ruin, dates from around 1300. Its harbour was first built in the middle of the 19th century but was destroyed by a storm in 1872 and rebuilt in 1889. A second harbour was constructed between 1897 and 1906 to provide a safe haven for whaling and fishing boats. It was in Gudhjem that smoked herrings were first prepared, in the town's typical smokehouses. Since the 1840s, smoked herrings have been sent to Copenhagen. The Gudhjem-Christiansø ferry has been functioning since 1684.

Landmarks

Gudhjem Mølle, Denmark's largest windmill, which stands at the top of the hill down into the town, was constructed in 1893. Taken out of service in 1962, it now houses a shop and a café.

Gudhjem is home to the Oluf Høst Museum where Bornholm's celebrated painter, Oluf Høst, spent the latter part of his life.

Gallery

References

External links

Cities and towns in the Capital Region of Denmark
Bornholm